Joseph "Joe" Blessing Ikhinmwin (born 18 September 1987) is a former British professional basketball player, who last played for the London Lions of the British Basketball League (BBL).

Biography

Early life 
Ikhinmwin began playing basketball at the age of 14. He started his career at East London Royals Junior program based in Whitechapel under the supervision of Humphrey Long and the Late Chris Morgan.

High school career 
In 2006 he entered Barking Abbey Basketball Academy, started playing for the Great Britain U20 team and became the team captain in 2007. In 2006-2007 he played for the London Leopards.

College career 
After graduating from Barking Abbey School sixth form he left Britain to study at Seminole State College in Oklahoma, where he played from 2008 to 2010 for the "Seminole State Trojans" (NJCAA). He sat out his first year due to a back injury but showed good performance in the last two seasons and transferred to NCAA South Carolina State Bulldogs in the MEAC for the 2010–2012 seasons where he averaged 6 points and 4 rebounds per game.

Professional career 
Ikhinmwin played his rookie season in 2012/2013 as a member of Newcastle Eagles and finished with runners-up medals  in the BBL regular season, play-offs and Cup before leaving the team and signing to his hometown.

He started his London Lions career in September 2013. Over the first year he played multiple positions averaging just over 8 points and 4 rebounds per game while shooting 46% from the floor.

On 31 March 2014 Ikhinmwin won the 2014 BBL Trophy Slam Dunk contest in Glasgow's Emirates Arena at the BBL Trophy Finals. On the same day he represented the England team at an International Friendly against Scotland and scored 15 points.

In September 2014 his contract with Lions has been signed for another 2 years but was pulled off after 2 months. Joe re-established his contract and returned to Lions in December 2014.

2014/2015 season was a real comeback for the Lions, the team had made it to the BBL Play-Off final in May 2015 but lost to the Newcastle Eagles. In July 2015 Ikhinmwin became Lions’ team captain. In November 2015 Ikhinmwin's contribution helped the Lions in the game against Worcester Wolves earn a place in the semi-finals of the Cup.

In August 2017 he renewed his contract with the Lions for the next 2 seasons.
In September 2017 Ikhinmwin captained the Lions to their first national championship (Betway British Basketball All-Stars) since making the move from Milton Keynes to London. He re-signed with the Lions on 14 July 2020.

On 19 August 2021, Ikhinmwin announced his retirement from professional basketball.

Charity involvement 

Ikhinmwin supports a number of charity projects, being a GLL supported athlete and the ambassador of the GLL Sport Foundation, All Sports for Schools fund and London Sports Trust "Bounce for Change" initiative.

References

External links 
 Official website

1987 births
Living people
Basketball players from Greater London
Black British sportspeople
English men's basketball players
Junior college men's basketball players in the United States
Newcastle Eagles players
Seminole State College (Oklahoma) alumni
Small forwards
South Carolina State Bulldogs basketball players